Cerova is a village in the municipality of Krupanj, Serbia. According to the 2002 census, the village had Serb ethnic majority and  a population of 965 people.

Historical population

1948: 
1953: 1,497
1961: 1,469
1971: 1,356
1981: 1,237
1991: 1,070
2002: 965

References

Populated places in Mačva District